The 1934–35 NYU Violets men's basketball team represented New York University in intercollegiate basketball during the 1934–35 season. The team finished the season with an 18–1 record and was retroactively named the national champion by the Helms Athletic Foundation and the Premo-Porretta Power Poll. On January 5, 1935, in a game against perennial powerhouse Kentucky, the Violets edged the Wildcats by one point played at Madison Square Garden. The 1934–35 squad was led by head coach and future Basketball Hall of Famer Howard Cann, while the team captain was Sidney Gross, an athlete later inducted into the NYU hall of fame.

References

NYU Violets men's basketball seasons
Nyu
NCAA Division I men's basketball tournament championship seasons
NYU
NYU